Chaleshtor (also Romanized as Chāleshtor and Chāl Shotor) is a city in Howmeh Rural District, in the Central District of Shahrekord County, Chaharmahal and Bakhtiari Province, Iran. At the 2006 census, its population was 6,720, in 1,680 families.<ref></ref

References 

Populated places in Shahr-e Kord County